Patrick Doyle (born 6 April 1953) is a Scottish composer, best known for his film scores. During his 50-year career in film, television and theatre he has composed the scores for over 60 feature films. A longtime collaborator of actor-director Kenneth Branagh, he is known for his work on films such as Henry V, Sense and Sensibility, Hamlet, Carlito's Way, and Gosford Park, as well as Harry Potter and the Goblet of Fire, Rise of the Planet of the Apes, Thor, Brave, Cinderella, Murder on the Orient Express and Death on the Nile.

He has scored the films of many renowned directors including Robert Altman, Ang Lee, Alfonso Cuarón, Mike Newell, Brian De Palma, Chen Kaige, Amma Asante, Régis Wargnier and Kenneth Branagh.

Doyle has been nominated for two Academy Awards and two Golden Globe Awards, one BAFTA and two Caesars and he won the Ivor Novello Award for Best Film Theme, for ‘Henry V’. He has been awarded the Lifetime Achievement Award from both The World Soundtrack Awards and Scottish BAFTA, the PRS Award for Extraordinary Achievement in Music and received the ASCAP Henry Mancini Award for "outstanding achievements and contributions to the world of film and television music."

On 18 February 2023, Buckingham Palace announced that Patrick Doyle has been commissioned to compose The Coronation March which will be performed live as part of The Coronation of Their Majesties, The King and The Queen Consort, at Westminster Abbey on Saturday 6 May 2023.

Life and career

Early life 
Patrick Doyle was born in Uddingston, South Lanarkshire, Scotland. He is a classically trained composer who studied at the Royal Scottish Academy of Music graduating in 1975, and from which he was made a Fellow in 2001.

Film career 
Doyle started out as an actor in the late 1970s, appearing in TV as well as film.  He joined Kenneth Branagh's Renaissance Theatre Company in 1987 as composer and musical director, composing music for plays such as Hamlet, As You Like It, and Look Back in Anger. It was here that he established his relationship with Kenneth Branagh, scoring his first film, Henry V, in 1989 with the score being conducted by Sir Simon Rattle. The song "Non Nobis, Domine" from Henry V won the 1989 Ivor Novello Award for Best Film Theme. He has since composed for 14 more Branagh films, including Dead Again (1991), Much Ado About Nothing (1993), Mary Shelley's Frankenstein (1994), Hamlet (1996), Love's Labour's Lost (2000), As You Like It (2006), Sleuth (2007), Thor (2011), Jack Ryan: Shadow Recruit (2014), Cinderella (2015), Murder on the Orient Express (2017), Artemis Fowl (2020) and Death on the Nile (2022).

In October 1997, shortly after composing for Great Expectations, directed by Alfonso Cuarón, Doyle was diagnosed with leukemia. He managed to write the entire score for the animated fantasy Quest for Camelot (1998) in hospital whilst undergoing treatment, and eventually made a full recovery.

Other films he scored in the 1990s have become cult gangster classics, such as Brian De Palma’s Carlito’s Way (1993) and Mike Newell's Donnie Brasco (1997).

In the 2000s, Doyle composed for iconic British movies such as Bridget Jones’ Diary (2001), Gosford Park (2001) and Calendar Girls (2003).

He collaborated with Mike Newell again on Harry Potter and the Goblet of Fire in 2005.

In the 2010s, he wrote scores for Hollywood blockbusters including Thor (2011), Rise of the Planet of the Apes (2011) and Cinderella (2015).

Other notable work includes his scores for family movies such as Brave (2012), Nanny McPhee (2005) and A Little Princess (1995).

He has scored multiple films for celebrated French director Régis Wargnier, including Indochine (1992), Une femme française (1995) and Est-ouest (1999). His scores for Indochine and Est-ouest were nominated for a César Award for Best Music Written for a Film.

Artist collaborations 
Doyle regularly collaborates with artists from other fields in his scores. From the classical music world, Plácido Domingo sang "In Pace" on Hamlet and Jane Eaglen sang "Weep You No More Sad Fountains" on Sense & Sensibility, with both films earning Doyle Oscar nominations for Best Film Score.

Pop artists Doyle has collaborated with include Jarvis Cocker on Harry Potter and the Goblet of Fire, as well as Pulp and Tori Amos on Great Expectations. He co-wrote "I find your love" with Nashville-based singer Beth Neilsen Chapman for Calendar Girls, and co-wrote the song "Never Forget" with Kenneth Branagh for Murder on the Orient Express, which was performed by Michelle Pfeiffer.

Concert works and Original commissions 
Doyle’s Music from the Movies concert, in aid of Leukaemia Research UK, was staged at the Royal Albert Hall in 2007. Directed by Kenneth Branagh and written by Daniel Hill, it included appearances from Emma Thompson, Sir Derek Jacobi, Dame Judi Dench, Alan Rickman, Imelda Staunton, Richard E. Grant, Adrian Lester, and Robbie Coltrane, with music from Doyle's scores performed by the London Symphony Orchestra.

Doyle’s work was celebrated in two concerts at the Celtic Connections festival in Glasgow in 2019, both performed by the BBC Scottish Symphony Orchestra and conducted by Dirk Brossé. The first concert was the world’s first live performance to film of the music Doyle composed for Pixar’s Brave, which took place at the Glasgow Concert Hall. The second, “Patrick Doyle – A Celebration,” took place at the Glasgow City Halls and featured two original works composed by Doyle for the concert: "Sweet Rois of Vertew" and "Scottish Overture". The concert also featured a performance of "Corarsik", a solo violin piece he originally composed for Emma Thompson’s 50th birthday.

Doyle has composed numerous concert pieces, including "The Thistle and the Rose," a song cycle commissioned by Prince Charles in honour of the Queen Mother’s 90th birthday, produced by George Martin and premiered at Buckingham Palace; "The Face In The Lake", commissioned by Sony and narrated by Kate Winslet; and "Tam O Shanter," commissioned by the Scottish Schools Orchestra Trust.

The Syracuse International Film Festival commissioned Doyle to write a film score for the classic silent movie ‘It’ in 2012. In 2015 it was subsequently performed by members of both the Royal Conservatoire of Scotland Junior Orchestra as well as Lanarkshire’s Arts and Film Orchestra, as part of pioneering music education initiatives which Doyle supports.

Several French film festivals have hosted Doyle as their guest of honour, including Festival international du film d'Aubagne, where Cinderella was screened; Festival International Musique et Cinéma à Auxerre Congrexpo; and the 1er Salon du Cinema.

Recorded works 
In 2013, Doyle composed an original concert suite, Impressions of America, released by Varèse Sarabande. It was performed in 2012 by the National Schools Symphony Orchestra, of which Doyle is a patron.

Doyle recorded a solo piano album in 2015, performing pieces from his film scores; it was released by Varèse Sarabande.

In 2020, Doyle contributed the opening track "Château Ferguson" of the album Fresh Air… Breathe In, in aid of the not-for-profit organisation Breathe Arts Health Research, in response to the COVID-19 pandemic.

In 2022, Doyle released a recorded album entitled Robert Burns - Love Songs for Solo Piano   in which he performs a newly arranged collection of works penned by Scotland's world-famous National Baird.

Awards 
In June 2013, at the 28th annual Film & Television Music Awards, Doyle received the ASCAP Henry Mancini Award in recognition of his "outstanding achievements and contributions to the world of film and television music". ASCAP President and Chairman Paul Williams observed, "Patrick Doyle's extensive body of work is some of the most compelling and affective in the industry. His flawless ability to cross genres in film, TV and beyond is why he can successfully score everything from Carlito's Way to Harry Potter and the Goblet of Fire."

In October 2015, Doyle received the Lifetime Achievement Award from the World Soundtrack Academy during the Gent Film Festival in Belgium.

In 2018 Doyle received an Honorary Doctorate from the University of the West of Scotland.

Personal life 
Doyle lives with his wife Lesley, with whom he has four children.

Filmography

Awards and nominations

See also
 Harry Potter music

References

External links
 
 
 2013 interview at FilmScoreMonthly.com
 2015 interview at FilmMusicSite.com

1953 births
Living people
Alumni of the Royal Conservatoire of Scotland
Animated film score composers
British film score composers
British male film score composers
Ivor Novello Award winners
People from Uddingston
Scottish film score composers
Scottish people of Irish descent